Everard t'Serclaes, Lord of Kruikenburg (c. 1320 – 31 March 1388) was a citizen of Brussels who was made famous by his recovery of the city from the Flemings. His brother, Jean, was bishop of Cambrai.

After the death of John III of Brabant on 5 December 1355, his daughter Joanna and her husband, Wenceslaus, succeeded him as rulers of the duchy. Their succession was disputed by the count of Flanders, Louis de Male.  Louis invaded Brabant and quickly seized Brussels. On the night of 24 October 1356, Everard scaled the city walls leading a group of patriots and drove the Flemings from the city. This enabled Joanna and Wenceslaus to make their Joyous Entry into the city.

Everard was later made schepen (alderman) of the city five times. As an old man he led the successful opposition to the selling of a section of crown land to Sweder of Abcoude, lord of Gaasbeek. A group led by Sweder's illegitimate son ambushed, beat, and mutilated Everard on the road from Lennik to Brussels. He died five days later as a result of the attack. In response, the citizens of Brussels, joined by allies from across Brabant, razed Gaasbeek Castle.

Everard is commemorated by a monument sculpted by artist Julien Dillens (1849–1904), which is located on Charles Buls street in Brussels, just off the Grand-Place. It is said among locals that the statue of Everard t'Serclaes brings luck and grants the wishes of all who touch it. Many tourists touch (or rather rub) the statue, particularly the arm, because legend has it that rubbing the arm will ensure one's return to Brussels. Other parts are also touched frequently by the tourists such as the face of an angel, a dog, and one of the shields. This constant polishing keeps the body shining compared to the rest of the sculpture.

References

1320 births
1388 deaths
Year of birth uncertain
People from Brussels
Everard